Jodie Anne Laubenberg is an American politician from Texas. Laubenberg is a former Republican member of the Texas House of Representatives from District 89 in Collin County in suburban Dallas, Texas.

Early life 
On April 20, 1957, Laubenberg was born in Parker, Texas.

Education 
Laubenberg earned a Bachelor of Arts degree from University of Texas at Austin.

Career 
In 2003, Laubenberg served as a Republican member of the Texas House of Representatives from District 89 in Collin County in suburban Dallas, Texas, until 2018. In 2018, Laubenberg chose not to run for reelection.

During the 78th legislature, Laubenberg was chairman of the Health Committee. During the 84th and 85th legislatures, she was chairman of the elections committee.

In 2018, Laubenberg retired after serving 8 terms as a member of Texas House of Representatives.

Personal life 
Laubenberg's husband is Bob. They have two children.

References

External links 
 Jodie Laubenberg at ballotpedia.org
 Laubenberg, Jodie Anne at ourcampaigns.com
 Jodie Laubenberg at collincountygop.org

Place of birth missing (living people)
1957 births
Living people
University of Texas at Austin alumni
Republican Party members of the Texas House of Representatives
Women state legislators in Texas
People from Parker, Texas
21st-century American politicians
21st-century American women politicians